James Francis Pembroke (27 January 1946 – 8 October 2021) was a British musician who was the vocalist of the Finnish progressive rock band Wigwam.

Life and career
Pembroke was born in London, and played with London group Taverners' Guild before arriving in Finland in 1965. 

He immediately found himself in some demand, gigging on an ad hoc basis with various lineups such as the Beatmakers, later renamed Jormas, until forming The Pems.   He joined Blues Section in 1967, recording a blues-jazz-pop fusion album now considered seminal in Finnish rock. After the band folded, Pembroke taught himself piano, then joined Wigwam in early 1969. He remained their frontman and principal songwriter, while also releasing occasional solo records. In 2013, Pembroke was granted an artist's pension by the Finnish state.

In the mid-1990s, he moved to the United States, married, and later lived in Kansas City, Missouri.

Pembroke died in Kansas City on 8 October 2021, aged 75.

Solo discography
Wicked Ivory (under the pseudonym "Hot Thumbs O'Riley"), Love Records 1972
Pigworm, Love Records 1974
Corporal Cauliflowers Mental Function, Love Records 1977
Flat Broke (as the "Jim Pembroke Band"), Ponsi 1980
Party Upstairs, Johanna 1981
If the Rain Comes, TUM Records 2014

References

External links
 2000 interview
 
 

1946 births
2021 deaths
Singers from London
Wigwam (Finnish band) members